Bajamal cabinst was the cabinet of Yemen led by Abdul Qadir Bajamal from 17 May 2003 to 11 February 2006.

List of ministers

See also 
 Politics of Yemen

References 

Cabinets of Yemen
2003 establishments in Yemen
Second Bajamal Cabinet